Events from the year 1777 in Great Britain.

Incumbents
 Monarch – George III
 Prime Minister – Frederick North, Lord North (Tory)
 Parliament – 14th

Events
 3 January – American Revolution: American general George Washington defeats British general Charles Cornwallis at the Battle of Princeton.
 1 May – legal case of Goodright v. Stevens decides that the declaration of either parent cannot be accepted to prove that a child born in wedlock is a bastard.
 8 May – first performance of Richard Brinsley Sheridan's comedy of manners The School for Scandal at the Theatre Royal, Drury Lane in London.
 May – completion of the Trent and Mersey Canal.
 21 July – Holmfirth Flood in the Holme Valley of West Yorkshire: three drowned.
 16 August – American Revolution: at the Battle of Bennington British and Brunswicker forces are decisively defeated by American troops.
 8 September – inauguration of Bath and West of England Society for the Encouragement of Agriculture, Arts, Manufactures and Commerce.
 11 September – American Revolution: Battle of Brandywine is a major victory for British in Chester County, Pennsylvania.
 19 September – American Revolution: first Battle of Saratoga/Battle of Freeman's Farm/Battle of Bemis Heights.
 4 October – American Revolution: at the Battle of Germantown, troops under George Washington are repelled by British troops under Sir William Howe.
 17 October – American Revolution: American victory at the Battle of Saratoga.
 24 December – Kiritimati discovered by James Cook.

Undated
 William Bass establishes the Bass Brewery at Burton upon Trent.

Publications
 Encyclopædia Britannica Second Edition begins publication.
 Laws Respecting Women, as they Regard Their Natural Rights is published by Joseph Johnson.
 John Howard's study The State of the Prisons in England and Wales.
 Clara Reeve’s Gothic novel The Champion of Virtue (anonymously), later known as The Old English Baron.

Births
 22 January – Joseph Hume, doctor and politician (died 1855)
 3 February – John Cheyne, physician (died 1836) 
 16 February – Benjamin D'Urban, general and colonial administrator (died 1849)
 1 April – William Gell, archaeologist (died 1836)
 24 June – John Ross, Arctic explorer (died 1856)
 9 July – Henry Hallam, historian (died 1859)
 3 November – Princess Sophia, fifth daughter of King George III (died 1848)

Deaths
 12 January – Hugh Mercer, soldier and physician, dies in Princeton, New Jersey, United States (born 1726)
 11 May – George Pigot, Baron Pigot, governor of Madras (born 1719)
 19 or 27 May – Button Gwinnett, 2nd Governor of Georgia, dies near Savannah, Georgia, United States (born 1735)
 27 July – William Hayes, composer (bapt. 1708)
 7 October – Simon Fraser, general (born 1729)
 21 October – Samuel Foote, dramatist and actor (born 1720)
 26 December – Dolly Pentreath, last-known fluent native speaker of the Cornish language (born 1692)

References

Further reading
 

 
Years in Great Britain